is a Japanese former Nippon Professional Baseball catcher, and current the third squad battery coach for the Fukuoka SoftBank Hawks of Nippon Professional Baseball (NPB).

He previously played for the Chunichi Dragons, the Chiba Lotte Marines.

Professional career

Active player era
On November 21, 1992, Yoshitsuru was drafted  fourth round pick by the Chunichi Dragons in the  1992 Nippon Professional Baseball draft.

He made his debut in the Central League during the 1993 season, played 24 games.

He played three seasons with the Dragons, but in 1996, his fourth season, he was traded to the Chiba Lotte Marines along with Tsuyoshi Yoda.

He played in a career-high 98 games for the Marines during the 1997 season and set a career-high .283 batting average during the 1998 season, and he played 10 seasons with the Marines and retired after the 2002 season.

In his 10-season career, Yoshitsuru played a total of 389 games, batting .236 with 147 hits, nine home runs, and 59 RBI.

After retirement
After his retirement, Yoshitsuru was the battery coach for the Chiba Lotte Marines from the 2003 season through the 2016 season.

He became the third squad battery coach for the Fukuoka Softbank Hawks in the 2017 season and moved to first squad battery coach for the 2018 season.

He will serve as the third squad battery coach for the second time during the 2023 season.

References

External links

 Career statistics - NPB.jp 
 95 Kenji Yoshitsuru PLAYERS2022 - Fukuoka SoftBank Hawks Official site

1971 births
Living people
Baseball people from Kagoshima Prefecture 
Japanese baseball players
Nippon Professional Baseball catchers
Chunichi Dragons players
Chiba Lotte Marines players
Japanese baseball coaches
Nippon Professional Baseball coaches
People from Kagoshima